Michael Chidi Alozie (born 16 October 1986 in Eputu Town) is a Nigerian professional footballer who last played for Sereď.

Career
The striker began his career with Swift Eagles in his native Nigeria and signed than in February 2004 for Beroe Stara Zagora in Bulgaria.

Ukraine
Chidi Alozie spent almost 10 years in Ukraine. He was signed by FC Metalurh Zaporizhya of the Ukrainian Premier League, played previously successful three-years with Volyn Lutsk. On 29 January 2011 left FC Metalurh Zaporizhya and signed with PFK Sevastopol. In 2014 left PFK Sevastopol.

Slovakia
In 2015 Alozie signed with Slovakian ŠKF Sereď.

International career
On 29 December 2007 Alozie was called up to the Nigeria national football team, but never played a single game.

References

External links

1986 births
Living people
Nigerian footballers
Nigerian expatriate footballers
Expatriate footballers in Bulgaria
Expatriate footballers in Ukraine
Nigerian expatriate sportspeople in Ukraine
Nigerian expatriate sportspeople in Bulgaria
Nigerian expatriate sportspeople in Slovakia
Expatriate footballers in Slovakia
Ukrainian Premier League players
PFC Beroe Stara Zagora players
FC Volyn Lutsk players
FC Metalurh Zaporizhzhia players
FC Sevastopol players
ŠKF Sereď players
2. Liga (Slovakia) players
First Professional Football League (Bulgaria) players
Association football forwards